Robert Nesbitt may refer to:

 Robert Nesbitt (theatre director) (1906–1995), English theatre director, theatrical producer and impresario
 Robert Nesbitt (solicitor) (1868–1944), British solicitor and Unionist politician
 Robert Taylor Nesbitt (1843–1913), American politician in Georgia
 Robert H. Nesbitt (1883–1966), Australian trade commissioner to New Zealand 
 Robert "Rab" C. Nesbitt, the lead character in the Scottish comedy series Rab C. Nesbitt